The Administrator of Tristan da Cunha is the head of government and representative of the Governor of Saint Helena in Tristan da Cunha.

Objective 

The role of the Administrator is to chair the territory's Island Council which consists of eight elected members and three appointed members. As a part of the British overseas territory of Saint Helena, Ascension and Tristan da Cunha, the head of state is Charles III, with the Governor of Saint Helena appointed by the British government to act as his local representative.

Previously the Administrator also acted as the local magistrate, but the appointment is to be transferred to a non-member of the executive or legislative branches of government.

History 

The first Administrator, appointed during World War II, was Surgeon Lieutenant Commander E. J. S. Woolley, the head of the 16-man British naval garrison on the island which was charged with monitoring German submarines and intercepting their communications.

The first appointee to the post was Sir Hugh Elliott in 1949, when commercial development began of the local crayfish catch, for export markets. There was then no currency on Tristan da Cunha: local trade was by barter. Elliott's activities included the island's first postal service and discovery of a new species of flea, which he named for his wife Elizabeth.

The Administrator has his own flag, a Union Jack with the addition of the territory's coat of arms in the centre of the flag.

List of Administrators 

The following is a complete list of Administrators of Tristan da Cunha:

References

External links 

 Tristan da Cunha Administrator – Tristan da Cunha Government & Tristan da Cunha Association